is a railway station on the Jōetsu Line in the city of Minamiuonuma, Niigata, Japan, operated by the East Japan Railway Company (JR East).

Lines

Station layout
The station has  a single elevated island platform connected to a two-story station building on its second floor. The station previously also had a side platform for use seasonally, which accounts for the odd platform numbering. The station has a Midori no Madoguchi staffed ticket office.

Platforms

History
Ishiuchi Station opened on 1 November 1925. Upon the privatization of the Japanese National Railways (JNR) on 1 April 1987, it came under the control of JR East.

Passenger statistics
In fiscal 2017, the station was used by an average of 122 passengers daily (boarding passengers only).

Surrounding area
Ishiuchi Maruyama Ski Resort
Ishiuchi Hanaoka Ski Resort

See also
 List of railway stations in Japan

References

External links

 Ishiuchi Station information (JR East) 

Railway stations in Niigata Prefecture
Railway stations in Japan opened in 1925
Stations of East Japan Railway Company
Jōetsu Line
Minamiuonuma